McBrine is a surname. Notable people with the surname include:

Andy McBrine (born 1993), Irish cricketer
James McBrine (born 1963), Irish cricketer
Junior McBrine (born 1963), Irish cricketer

See also
McBride (surname)
McBrien